China Pabst Blue Ribbon is a brand of beer sold in China. It is produced, marketed and distributed by CBR Brewing Company, Inc., which is a Virgin Islands-owned holding company located in Hong Kong. It jointly owns the brand and breweries along with Guangdong Blue Ribbon Group under a sub-licensing agreement with the Pabst Brewing Company.  

According to a Bloomberg Businessweek profile, the CBR Brewing Co. was established in 1988.

China Pabst beer was first produced in China under the Pabst trademark in Zhaoqing Brewery located in Zhaoqing, Guangdong. The brewery itself is located in the suburbs between the streets of Ban Yue road, Kangle North road and Cui Xing road. Its exact geolocation is labeled as Blueribbon beer on the Google map of Zhaoqing. The beer is now produced in three other breweries in other parts of China as well and it is uncertain as to whether the Zhaoqing brewery remains the main location for brewing.  The cooperation between the two sides started with Pabst selling three previously mothballed breweries to their future partners in China.   

As of 1999, the Zhaoqing brewery offered free tours of the inside of the brewery including the bottling area, brewery outside grounds and the actual beer making facilities.  The brewery also offered beer tastings at that time.  

Unlike the American version of Pabst Blue Ribbon, China Pabst has sought to position itself as a luxury brand, with bottles of its 1844 branded beer costing $44 (by 2018 standards).

Gallery

References

External links
 See the following references for ownership arrangements, structure, subsidiaries, licensing agreements, partnerships, affiliates, holding companies and offshore entities associated with China Pabst Blue Ribbon.
 For a brief review of CBR Brewing Company, see Company Overview of CBR Brewing Company Inc.

Beer in China
Chinese beer brands
Food and drink companies established in 1988
Companies based in Guangdong